1999–2000 Albanian Cup was the forty-eighth season of Albania's annual cup competition. It began on August 21, 1999 with the First Round and ended on May 6, 2000 with the Final match. The winners of the competition qualified for the 2000-01 first round of the UEFA Europa League. Tirana were the defending champions, having won their tenth Albanian Cup last season. The cup was won by Teuta.

The rounds were played in a two-legged format similar to those of European competitions. If the aggregated score was tied after both games, the team with the higher number of away goals advanced. If the number of away goals was equal in both games, the match was decided by extra time and a penalty shootout, if necessary.

First round
Games were played on August 21 & 28, 1999.

|}

Second round
Games were played on January 22 & 29, 2000.

|}

Quarter-finals
In this round entered the 8 winners from the previous round. Games were played on February 3 & 13, 2000.

|}

Semi-finals
In this round entered the four winners from the previous round. Games were played on April 12 & 19, 2000.

|}

Final

References

 Calcio Mondiale Web

External links
 Official website 

Cup
1999–2000 domestic association football cups
1999-00